Reza Sadeghi  ((April 20, 1977 – March 17, 1998) was an Iranian mathematician.  He is an alumnus of National Organization for Development of Exceptional Talents (NODET) Mashad, Iran (Hasheminejad highschool).

Prizes
Reza Sadeghi won the silver medal in the International Mathematical Olympiad in Hong Kong in 1994.  He won the gold medal in the International Mathematical Olympiad in Canada in 1995.

References

1977 births
International Mathematical Olympiad participants
20th-century Iranian mathematicians
Iranian Mathematics Competition Medalists
Geometers
Sharif University of Technology alumni
Possibly living people